Abdurakhmanov is a surname. Notable people with the surname include:

Ilgar Abdurakhmanov (born 1979), Azerbaijani footballer
Kanti Abdurakhmanov (1916–2000), Soviet World War II military officer and Chechen warlord
Nabi Abdurakhmanov (born 1958), Uzbek theatre producer and director
Odiljon Abdurakhmanov (born 1996), Kyrgyzstani footballer
Odil Abdurakhmanov (born 1978), Uzbek politician
Tumso Abdurakhmanov (1985–2022), Chechen dissident